Charles Heyward Barker (April 12, 1935 – June 4, 1953) was a United States Army soldier in the Korean War who received the U.S. military's highest decoration, the Medal of Honor.

Biography 
Born on April 12, 1935, in Pickens County, South Carolina, Barker joined the Army from that county in 1952. He served in Korea as a private with Company K of the 17th Infantry Regiment, 7th Infantry Division. During the Battle of Pork Chop Hill on June 4, 1953, near Sokkogae, his platoon was on patrol outside the Pork Chop outpost when they surprised a group of Chinese soldiers digging entrenchments. Barker and another soldier provided covering fire with their rifles and grenades while the rest of the platoon moved to a better position on higher ground. As the fight intensified and ammunition ran low, the platoon was ordered to withdraw to the outpost. Barker volunteered to stay behind and cover the retreat; he was last seen engaging Chinese soldiers in hand-to-hand combat.

Barker was initially classified as missing in action, then declared dead one year after the battle. He was posthumously promoted to private first class and, on June 7, 1955, awarded the Medal of Honor for his actions on Pork Chop Hill.

Medal of Honor citation
Barker's official Medal of Honor citation reads:
Pfc. Barker, a member of Company K, distinguished himself by conspicuous gallantry and indomitable courage above and beyond the call of duty in action against the enemy. While participating in a combat patrol engaged in screening an approach to "Pork-Chop Outpost," Pfc. Barker and his companions surprised and engaged an enemy group digging emplacements on the slope. Totally unprepared, the hostile troops sought cover. After ordering Pfc. Barker and a comrade to lay down a base of fire, the patrol leader maneuvered the remainder of the platoon to a vantage point on higher ground. Pfc. Barker moved to an open area firing his rifle and hurling grenades on the hostile positions. As enemy action increased in volume and intensity, mortar bursts fell on friendly positions, ammunition was in critical supply, and the platoon was ordered to withdraw into a perimeter defense preparatory to moving back to the outpost. Voluntarily electing to cover the retrograde movement, he gallantly maintained a defense and was last seen in close hand-to-hand combat with the enemy. Pfc. Barker's unflinching courage, consummate devotion to duty, and supreme sacrifice enabled the patrol to complete the mission and effect an orderly withdrawal to friendly lines, reflecting lasting glory upon himself and upholding the highest traditions of the military service.

See also

List of Korean War Medal of Honor recipients

References

External links 
 

1935 births
1953 deaths
People from Six Mile, South Carolina
United States Army soldiers
American military personnel killed in the Korean War
United States Army Medal of Honor recipients
Korean War recipients of the Medal of Honor
United States Army personnel of the Korean War
Military personnel missing in action